Younger v. Harris, 401 U.S. 37 (1971), was a case in which the United States Supreme Court held that United States federal courts were required to abstain from hearing any civil rights tort claims brought by a person who is currently being prosecuted for a matter arising from that claim.

Facts
A California statute prohibited advocating "unlawful acts of force or violence [to] effect political change."  The defendant, Harris, was charged with violating the statute, and he sued under 42 U.S.C. § 1983 to get an injunction preventing District Attorney Evelle J. Younger from enforcing the law on the grounds that it violated the free speech guarantee.

Decision and precedent
In an 8–1 decision, the Court held that federal courts may not hear the case until the person is convicted or found not guilty of the crime unless the defendant will suffer an irreparable injury that is "both great and immediate." Merely having to endure a criminal prosecution is no such irreparable harm.

There are three exceptions to Younger abstention:
Where the prosecution is in bad faith (i.e. the state knows the person to be innocent)—as applied in Dombrowski v. Pfister; or 
Where the prosecution is part of some pattern of harassment against an individual; or
Where the law being enforced is utterly and irredeemably unconstitutional (e.g., if the state were to pass a law making it a crime to say anything negative about its governor under any circumstances).

Status as precedent
The doctrine was later extended to situations where the state is seeking to execute a civil fine against someone, or has jailed a person for contempt of court. The doctrine applies even where the state does not bring an action until after the person has filed a lawsuit in federal court, provided that the federal court has not yet taken any action on the suit. Moreover, the principle of abstention applies to some state administrative proceedings.

In regard to the exceptions which the Younger Court articulated, later decisions make it clear that these are highly difficult to meet. 
Bad faith prosecution: in no case since Younger was decided has the Supreme Court found there to exist bad faith prosecution sufficient to justify a federal court injunction against state court proceedings. The Court has specifically declined to find bad faith prosecution even in circumstances where repeated prosecutions had occurred. As commentator Erwin Chemerinsky states, the bad-faith prosecution exception seems narrowly limited to facts like those in Dombrowski.   Other scholars have even asserted that the possible range of cases which would fit the Dombrowski model and allow an exception to the no-injunction rule is so limited as to be an "empty universe."
Patently unconstitutional law: in no case since Younger was decided has the Supreme court found there to exist a patently unconstitutional law sufficient to justify a federal court injunction against state court proceedings. The Court has specifically declined to find such patent unconstitutionality in at least one case (Trainor v. Hernandez) 
Inadequate state forum: the Supreme Court has found the state forum in question to be inadequate on a small number of occasions.

See also 
 Abstention doctrine
 Anti-Injunction Act (1793)

References

External links
 
 

United States Supreme Court cases
United States Supreme Court cases of the Burger Court
United States Constitution Article Three case law
United States abstention case law
1971 in United States case law